North Triangle Common Station (official temporary designation: Unified Grand Central Station, also called Grand Central Station), popularly known as the Common Station, is an under-construction rapid transit terminal and transport hub that will connect LRT Line 1, MRT Line 3 and Line 7, and the nearby Metro Manila Subway. It is located in Bagong Pag-asa, Quezon City, Philippines, and is named after its location, which is at the corner of EDSA and North Avenue.

The common alignment had been in limbo for years since the Department of Transportation and Communications (DOTC), now Department of Transportation (DOTr), reviewed the project's technical and financial components. It was in January 2017 that an agreement was reached to build the station. The groundbreaking of the station was held at the North Triangle Transport Terminal on September 29, 2017. The station was expected to open in January 2021, but has now been targeted to 2025.

History

Negotiations 
On June 2, 2011, the Department of Transportation and Communications (DOTC) called for bidders for the contract to build the station, which was estimated to cost . But on July 13 of that year, then-Secretary of Transportation and Communications Mar Roxas announced a review of the project and considering adding store space for lease. The government, by that time, had allotted  for its construction.

On July 22, 2012, the government shelved the project indefinitely due to the Philippine financial crisis in favor of demolition of the tracks and pillars. Secretary Roxas said that the station was being studied by engineers because the MRT-3's original plans did not include the station, and that problems with the line's timing system may arise. He included that in the event that the station does not go through, the  paid by SM Prime Holdings, Inc., the operator of SM City North EDSA and other SM Malls, to the Light Rail Transit Authority for naming rights may have to be returned.

However, at the start of the year 2013, Roxas' successor new Transportation and Communications secretary Joseph Emilio Abaya cites that the government has cancelled and abandoned the project indefinitely because the construction of the common station was supposed to be completed back in May 2010 during the presidency of Gloria Macapagal Arroyo but disputes over cost, engineering issues and naming rights caused due to the halting of the project by Arroyo's successor President Benigno Aquino III on January 2, 2013.

On January 9, 2013, Abaya cites that the government has filed for the candidacies for three sites of the common station linking three rapid transit systems for Metro Manila, DOTC is not keen on build the common station in front of the Annex Building of the SM City North EDSA shopping mall, adding that other potential locations are the TriNoma mall and the Malvar LRT station in Caloocan. Abaya said the agency is awaiting the results of a study that would determine the final location of the common station. He had said the original design near SM City North EDSA Annex was "ineffective and costly" because the rails of Line 3 would have to be extended and trains would have to be added.

On November 21, 2013, the NEDA board, chaired by President Benigno Aquino III, approved the construction of a common station within North Avenue between SM City North EDSA and TriNoma, estimated to cost . The station was set to feature head-to-head platforms for LRT 1 and MRT 3 trains with a  elevated walkalator to MRT 7, inconsistent with the original plan of having seamless connectivity to Monumento and is also an unusual arrangement of having two train stations beside each other. Secretary Abaya said that SM would be able to keep the naming rights for the station, even if it is transferred near rival Ayala's TriNoma mall. This led to the change of the station's location, which was initially set to be near SM City North EDSA, earning the ire of the group of the country's largest mall operator SM Prime Holdings Inc., which paid an initial P200 million for the naming rights of the station.

Transportation officials have repeatedly said building the station near TriNoma is both economically and environmentally viable, as this would result in a lower cost and less urban blight.

SM Prime then brought its battle to the Supreme Court, which issued a stay order against the DOTC and the Light Rail Transit Authority (LRTA) in June 2014, enjoining them to stop the transfer of the common alignment's location.

Agreement
At a business forum held on August 12, 2016, Department of Transportation (now abbreviated as DOTr) Secretary Arthur Tugade said that all stakeholders namely Metro Pacific Corporation, SMC-Mass Rail Transit 7 Inc. of San Miguel Corporation, SM Prime Holdings, and Ayala Corporation had agreed in principle that the common station will be built in North Avenue between the Southeast end of SM North EDSA and North side of the TriNoma Mall. Negotiations took about 8 years for the station to be built near SM North EDSA and TriNoma.

A memorandum of agreement was signed by the station's stakeholders on January 18, 2017.

Construction

The groundbreaking ceremony of the station was held on September 29, 2017, marking the start of construction. It is planned to be completed in the last quarter of 2022. Three areas were designated for the project with each area with its own developers. Area A which will host a platform and concourse for Lines 1 and 3 will be developed by the Department of Transportation. Area B, which covers two concourses that will connect Areas A and C will be developed by North Triangle Depot Commercial Corporation, an affiliate of Ayala Land. San Miguel Corporation will develop and finance Area C which will host the Line 7 platform.

The construction of Area A is carried out by the consortium of BF Corporation and Foresight Development and Surveying Company. The contract for the construction of Area A was signed on February 13, 2019. The Area A involves a spur line branching from Line 1's portion, reusing the previously dug foundations originally intended for the station in front of SM North EDSA for its pier beams. All-steel girders will be used.

, the station is 79.72% complete. The station was originally supposed to open on January 2021, but mainly due to the COVID-19 pandemic, which affected manpower as well as construction logistics delays, has now settled for partial operations in June 2023, with full operations expected to begin by 2025. Issues such as utilities relocation, the aforementioned pandemic-related issues, and systems upgrades (such as signalling & automated fare collection) contributed to repeated completion delays.

Naming
In 2009, SM Prime Holdings which owns SM North EDSA secured naming rights for the station by paying  while Ayala which owns TriNoma contributed  which also made it eligible for naming rights. In January 2017, it was agreed that naming rights of both SM Prime Holdings and Ayala will be honored and until the two companies agreed upon a name, the station shall be temporarily called as the Unified Grand Central Station.

Station layout
The station is divided into three primary areas: A, B, and C. Area A hosts a platform and concourse for Lines 1 and 3. Area B will connect Areas A and C. Area C hosts a platform and concourse for Line 7.

See also
List of rail transit stations in Metro Manila
Manila Light Rail Transit System

References

Manila Light Rail Transit System stations
Manila Metro Rail Transit System stations
Buildings and structures in Quezon City
Railway stations under construction in the Philippines
Railway stations scheduled to open in 2023